Albert S. Rodda, Jr. (July 23, 1912 – April 3, 2010) was a California State Senator.

Born in Sacramento, California, Rodda graduated from Sacramento High School in 1929 before receiving an A.B. in 1933 and an A.M. in 1934, both in history, from Stanford University, where he was a member of the Phi Beta Kappa Society. After teaching for several years in Sacramento high schools, Rodda entered the United States Navy Reserve and was a gunnery officer in World War II. Leaving the Navy Reserve in 1946, he started teaching at Sacramento City College. In 1951, Rodda received a Ph.D. in history and economics from Stanford.

A Democrat, Rodda won a 1958 special election to the California State Senate to represent the 19th District to fill the vacancy from the death of Earl D. Desmond, defeating Desmond's son and two other Democrats. He was re-elected six times but was defeated in 1980 in an upset by a newcomer, John Doolittle.

Rodda's best-known legislative legacy is SB 160, enacted in 1975 and taking effect in 1976, which established collective bargaining for California's public school teachers.

Shortly after Rodda's departure from the Senate, the California State Treasurer Jesse M. Unruh appointed Rodda as Executive Secretary of the Commission on State Finance. In 1983, Rodda left the Commission and was elected to the board of trustees of the Los Rios Community College District. He left the board in 1992. In 1980, the Los Rios Community College District Board named a new administrative-classroom complex at Sacramento City College as Rodda Hall.

Rodda met Clarice Horgan, an English teacher, when they both taught at Grant Union High School. They married in 1941 and had one son and two daughters.

References

1912 births
2010 deaths
Politicians from Sacramento, California
Stanford University alumni
Educators from California
Democratic Party California state senators
United States Navy personnel of World War II
20th-century American politicians